Blathur is a village in Kannur, Kerala, India, located approximately 38 kilometres north-east of the district headquarters, Kannur. The nearest town, Irikkur, is estimated to be 7 kilometres from the village itself. Blathur is situated in the Padiyoor Grama Panchayat in Iritty Taluk, on the edge of an estimated 90 acre paddy field, and is 169 meters above sea level. The area is rich in laterite rocks, and the main industry is based on laterite stone mining and agriculture.

History
The protest against the Madras Special Police (Kavumbayi Struggle) took place in the village on 30 December 1946.

Religious places
Moothedam Vettakkorumakan temple
Puthiya Bagavathikavu (Pothiyottam)
Thazhe Palliyath Kottam (Bhairavan Kottam)
Muthappan Matappura
Vishnu temple
Pothi Kottam
Kelampath Maanjhal Baghavathi temple
Pottan Kottam
Blathur Juma Masjid
Blathur Town Masjid (Bilal Masjid)
Badriyya Masjid, Blathur
Thaqwa Masjid Jeelani Nagar, Blathur

Dignitaries
Ramesan Blathur is a Malayalam novelist and short story writer from Blathur who won several awards including the Atlas Kairali Award, Ankanam Noval Award, Abhudabi Sakthi Award, Katathanat Udayavarma Raja Award, and Prof. Joseph Mundassery Award for his novel Perum Aal (D. C. Books).
Noufal Blathur is a story writer for cinema. He is a former student of Pune Film Institute. His debut Malayalam film Red Wine made a controversy even before its release.

Transportation
The national highway passes through Taliparamba town.  Mangalore and Mumbai can be accessed on the northern side and Cochin and Thiruvananthapuram can be accessed on the southern side.  The road to the east connects to Mysore and Bangalore.   The nearest railway station is Kannur on Mangalore-Palakkad line. There are airports at Mangalore and Calicut.

Gallery

References

Villages near Irikkur